Michel Étienne Bordet (? – Paris, 17 March 1892) was a 19th-century French playwright, actor and chansonnier.

An actor at the Théâtre de Belleville, on 1 February 1858 he established the review Paris chanté. Journal artistique, littéraire, poétique et de chansons commerciales which would be published until April.  

Stage manager of the théâtre de l'Ambigu-Comique from 1846, his plays were presented, among other, at the Théâtre Beaumarchais and the Théâtre-Lyrique.

Works 

1858: La-i-tou et tralala, folie-vaudeville in 1 act, with Charles Blondelet
1859: Ah ! Il a des bottes, Bastien !, comédie en vaudeville in 1 act, with Blondelet
1859: Le Passé et l'avenir (rondeaux), à-propos in 1 act
1860: France, Nice et Savoie, cantata
1860: Les Femmes, rondeau
1861: La Lisette du chansonnier, two-act play, mingled with singing, with Béranger
1863: À tous les diables, revue vaudeville in 2 acts and 2 tableaux, with J. Deschamps
1864: Encore une pilule, review, with Paul Faulquemont
1864: La Vendange, hymne à la vigne
1866: Je serai laboureur, one act play, mingled with singing
1872: Aux Enfants de Belleville, cantata
1872: Je suis Bellevillois, protestation
1874: A la chaudière !, review of the year 1874, with Georges Cavalier
1875: A l'amigo !, review of the year 1875 in 5 acts and 7 tableaux
1880: V'là Belleville qui passe, review in 2 acts
1883: Les Compagnons de l'avenir, drama in 5 acts
undated: Les Victoires de la paix, cantata

Bibliography 
 Louis Péricaud, Le Théâtre des Funambules : ses mimes, ses acteurs, et ses pantomimes depuis sa fondation, jusqu'à sa démolition, 1897, 
 Henry Lyonnet, Dictionnaire des comédiens français, vol. 1, 1911

References 

19th-century French dramatists and playwrights
19th-century French male actors
French male stage actors
French chansonniers
Year of birth missing
1892 deaths